John Augenstein (born October 7, 1997) is an American professional golfer.

In high school, Augenstein was a Kentucky individual state champion and team state finalist at Owensboro Catholic High School.

In college, Augenstein was a first team All-American for the Vanderbilt Commodores.

Augenstein earned an invitation to the 2020 U.S. Open and 2020 Masters Tournament by finishing runner-up at the 2019 U.S. Amateur. At the U.S. Open, he missed the cut. He was one of two amateurs to make the cut at the Masters and finished tied for 55th.
He turned professional shortly after the Masters.

Amateur wins
2018 Mason Rudolph Championship, Players Amateur
2019 Desert Mountain Intercollegiate

Source:

U.S. national team appearances
Amateur
Arnold Palmer Cup: 2019, 2020
Walker Cup: 2019 (winners)

Source:

References

External links

American male golfers
Sportspeople from Owensboro, Kentucky
1997 births
Living people